Alice Suki Waterhouse (born 5 January 1992) is an English model, actress and singer. She began a career in modelling at the age of 16, and she would go on to model for several major fashion labels. Her first feature film as an actress was a minor role in Pusher in 2012, and she has since appeared in films such as The Divergent Series: Insurgent, The Bad Batch, and Assassination Nation. In 2016, she co-founded the accessories brand Pop & Suki with Poppy Jamie and Leo Seigal.

Early life
Waterhouse was born in Hammersmith, London, and was raised in Chiswick, London, the daughter of Elizabeth, a cancer care nurse, and Norman Waterhouse, a plastic surgeon. She has a brother named Charlie, and two younger sisters, Madeleine, a model, and Imogen, a model and actress.

Career

Modelling

Waterhouse began her modelling career after being discovered in "either a Topshop or H&M" in London when she was 16. When she was 19, she became a lingerie model for Marks and Spencer.

She works for Burberry and Redken. Waterhouse has also modelled for Tommy Hilfiger Swatch, Lucy in Disguise, H&M, Alice + Olivia, Sass & bide and Pepe Jeans.

Waterhouse has appeared on the covers of British, Korean, Thai, Taiwanese and Turkish Vogue, Tatler, British and Korean Elle, Lucky, L'Officiel, American Marie Claire, French Grazia and 1883 Magazine. Waterhouse has also shot editorials for American, Chinese, Russian and Japanese Vogue, Love Magazine, American Elle, Velour, and Stylist Magazine among others. Waterhouse has also walked the runway for brands including Burberry, Alexander Wang and Balenciaga and is a regular on the front row at fashion week.

In April 2017, Waterhouse was chosen as the "Mercier Muse" for the makeup brand Laura Mercier.

Photography
Waterhouse has shown her photography work at the Eb and Flow gallery in London along with Reggie Yates and Imogen Morris Clarke in an exhibition presented by Next Model Management called 'I'll Be Your Mirror'. In February 2014, she posed completely nude for Dominic Jones Jewellery's autumn/winter campaign at London Fashion Week.

Acting
In 2014, Waterhouse played Bethany Williams in the romantic comedy Love, Rosie. She also played Marlene in the Divergent sequel The Divergent Series: Insurgent (2015), based on the book of the same name. Waterhouse played Arlen in Ana Lily Amirpour's romance thriller film The Bad Batch (2016). In June 2016, it was announced that Waterhouse would play Cecily of York in the Starz miniseries adaptation of the novel The White Princess by Philippa Gregory. In September 2016, it was announced that Waterhouse would star opposite Ansel Elgort in the film Jonathan. She has also played "The Girl" in the 2017 drama film The Girl Who Invented Kissing, written and directed by Tom Sierchio, and Quintana in Billionaire Boys Club (2018).
In 2023, Waterhouse portrays keyboardist Karen Sirko in the Amazon Prime series Daisy Jones & The Six. While the character in the novel by the same name is American, showrunner Scott Neustadter made the character British to "hammer home Karen's commitment to music and living a life dedicated to being in a great rock band."

Pop & Suki
In September 2016, Waterhouse announced the launch of Pop & Suki, an accessories brand that she co-founded with her best friend Poppy Jamie and CEO Leo Seigal. Pop & Suki has since been featured in Vogue, Harper's Bazaar, W and Elle.

Celebrities that have worn the brand include Jessica Alba, Lady Gaga, Cara Delevingne, Emily Ratajkowski, Lena Dunham and Taylor Hill. The brand's Camera Bag was referred to by Who What Wear as "The Bag Every It Girl Owns". The brand designed suitcases for Away.

Personal life 
Waterhouse dated musician Miles Kane from 2011 until 2013, actor Bradley Cooper from 2013 until 2015, and actor Diego Luna from 2016 until 2017. She has been in a relationship with actor Robert Pattinson since mid-2018. They reside in London.

Filmography

Discography

Albums

Extended plays

Singles

References

External links

1992 births
21st-century English actresses
Actresses from London
English expatriates in the United States
English female models
English film actresses
English television actresses
Living people
People from Chiswick